This is a list of women artists who were born in Sweden or whose artworks are closely associated with that country.

A 
Kerstin Abram-Nilsson (1931–1998), painter
Lena Ackebo (born 1950), cartoonist
Emma Adbåge (born 1982), illustrator and children's writer
Louise Adelborg (1885–1971), porcelain designer and textile artist
Maria Adelborg (1849–1940), textile artist
Ottilia Adelborg (1855–1936), illustrator and children's writer
Ulla Adlerfelt (1736–1765), painter
Sofia Adlersparre (1808–1862), painter
Märta Afzelius (1887–1961), textile artist and designer
Karin Ageman (1899–1950), designer, illustrator, poster artist
Sofia Ahlbom (1823–1868), lithographer, engraver
Lea Ahlborn (1829–1891), printmaker
Gerda Ahlm (1869–1956), painter and art conservator
Ester Almqvist (1869–1934), Expressionist painter
Margareta Alströmer (1763–1816), painter
Hjördis Piuva Andersson (born 1933), painter, writer
Karin Mamma Andersson (born 1962), painter
Maja Andersson Wirde (1873–1952), textile artist
Charlotta Arfwedson (1776–1862), painter
Elise Arnberg (1826–1891), miniaturist and photographer
Alma Arnell (1857–1934), painter
Efva Attling (born 1952), silversmith

B 
Barbro Bäckström (1939–1990), sculptor
Eva Bagge (1871–1964), painter
Inge Bagge (1916–1988), sculptor and painter
Jeanna Bauck (1840–1926), painter
Julia Beck (1853–1935), painter and calligrapher
Carolina Benedicks-Bruce (1856–1935), sculptor
Siri Berg (1921–2020), Swedish-American painter
Elisabeth Bergstrand-Poulsen (1887–1955), writer, painter, illustrator
Beata Bergström (1921–2016), photographer
Elsa Beskow (1874–1953), painter
Johanna Emerentia von Bilang (1777–1857), miniaturist
Anna Billing (1849–1927), landscape and still-life painter
Johanna Billing (born 1973), conceptual artist
Eva Billow (1902–1993), children's writer and illustrator
Elsa Björkman-Goldschmidt (1888–1982), writer and lithographer
Sigrid Blomberg (1863–1941), sculptor
Anna Boberg (1864–1935), painter, ceramist, textile artist
Eva Bonnier (1857–1909), painter
Vivianna Torun Bülow-Hübe (1927–2004), silversmith
Agnes Börjesson (1827–1900), painter
Agnes Branting (1862–1930), textile artist
Fanny Brate (1861–1940), painter
Maj Bring (1880–1971), painter
Johanna Brunsson (1846–1920), textile artist and educator
Arvida Byström (born 1991), photographer

C 
Anna Camner (born 1977), painter
Nina Canell (born 1979), sculptor, installation artist
Margareta Capsia (1682–1759), Swedish-Finnish painter, altarpiece decorator
Kerstin Cardon (1843–1924), portrait painter
Mina Carlson-Bredberg (1857–1943), painter
Christina Elisabeth Carowsky (1745–1797), painter
Maria Carowsky (1723–1793), painter
Anna Casparsson (1861–1961), textile artist, embroiderer
Marja Casparsson (1901–1993), painter
Anna Cassel (1860–1937), painter
Charlotta Cedercreutz (1736–1815), painter
Charlotta Cederström (1760–1832), painter
Elsa Celsing (1880–1974), Russian-Swedish painter
Emma Chadwick (1855–1932), painter
Loulou Cherinet (1970) Swedish-Ethiopian Video artist
Moki Cherry (1943–2009), interdisciplinary artist and designer
Ludmila Christeseva (born 1978), Belarus-born Swedish visual artist
Brita von Cöln (died 1707), painter
Lena Cronqvist (born 1938), painter, graphic artist and sculptor

D 
Elsie Dahlberg-Sundberg (1916–2005), sculptor and medalist
Kajsa Dahlberg (born 1973), contemporary artist
Ibe Dahlquist (1924–1996), silversmith
Siri Derkert (1888–1973), painter, sculptor
Ingrid Dessau (1923–2000), textile artist
Nathalie Djurberg (born 1978), video artist
Brita Drewsen (1887–1983), textile artist active in Denmark
Fredrika Eleonora von Düben (1738–1808), textile artist
Lotten von Düben (1828–1915), early amateur photographer

E 
Inger Edelfeldt (born 1956), author, illustrator
Anna Maria Ehrenstrahl (1666–1729), painter
Marianne Ehrenström  (1773–1867), painter
Karin Ek (born 1944), painter
Thérèse Ekblom (1867–1941), illustrator
Annika Ekdahl (born 1955), textile artist
Märta af Ekenstam (1880–1939), silversmith and metal worker
Marie-Louise Ekman (born 1944), filmmaker, painter
Emma Ekwall (1838–1925), painter
Ester Ellqvist (1880–1918), painter
Pye Engström (born 1928), sculptor
Eva Eriksson, (born 1949), illustrator
Lisa Erlandsdotter (1774–1854), tapestry artist
Anna Erlandsson (born 1956), illustrator, animator
Bengta Eskilsson (1836–1923), textile artist
Ulla Eson Bodin (1935–2009), textile artist and designer
Princess Eugénie of Sweden (1830–1889), amateur artist

F 
Greta Fahlcrantz (1889–1978), painter and sculptor
Ingrid Falk (born 1960), painter, photographer
Fanny Falkner (1891–1963), actress, miniaturist
Mollie Faustman (1883–1966), modernist painter, illustrator and journalist
Emy Fick (1876–1959), textile artist and businesswoman
Anna Fiske (born 1964), illustrator, now in Norway
Edith Fischerström (1881–1967), painter, woodcutter and sculptor
Maja Fjæstad (1873–1961), painter, textile artist and engraver
Christina Fredenheim (1762–1841), painter, singer
Maria Friberg (born 1966), painter, photographer
Anna Friberger (born 1944), illustrator, set designer
Emma Fürstenhoff (1802–1871), artist, florist

G 
Märtha Gahn (1881–1973), textile artist
Anna Gardell-Ericson (1853–1939), painter
Esther Gehlin (1892–1949), Danish-Swedish painter and textile artist
Margareta Christina Giers (1731–1796), painter
Sofia Gisberg (1824–1926), textile artist, sculptor and educator
Ida Gisiko-Spärck (1859–1940), landscape painter
Elisabeth Glantzberg (1873–1951), textile artist
Maria Johanna Görtz (1783–1853), florist painter
Thyra Grafström (1864–1925), textile artist
Brita Granström (born 1969), painter
Marianne Greenwood (1916–2006), photographer
Viola Gråsten (1910–1994), textile designer
Maja Gunn (born 1978), fashion designer
Carolina Gynning (born 1978), actress, jewelry designer, writer

H 
Johanna Hald (born 1945), photographer and screenwriter
Adélaïde Victoire Hall (1772–1844), Swedish-French painter
Ellen Roosval von Hallwyl (1867–1952), painter, sculptor, composer
Signe Hammarsten-Jansson (1882–1970), graphic artist, stamp designer
Berta Hansson (1910–1994), painter, sculptor and textile artist
Karin Hansson (born 1967), artist and researcher
Sonja Härdin (born 1945), illustrator
Annika von Hausswolff (born 1967), visual artist
Snövit Hedstierna (born 1980), visual artist, performance artist, director
Amalia von Helvig (1776–1831), artist, writer
Elli Hemberg (1896–1994), painter and sculptor
Nina Hemmingsson (born 1971), cartoonist
Ester Henning (1887–1985), painter
Helena Henschen (1940–2011), designer, writer
Kakan Hermansson (born 1981), ceramicist, comedian
Helena Hernmarck (born 1941), tapestry artist
Brita Sofia Hesselius (1801–1866), probably the first professional female photographer in Sweden
Anna Maria Hilfeling, (1713–1783), miniaturist
Hanna Hirsch-Pauli (1713–1783), painter
Sigrid Hjertén (1885–1948), modernist painter
Gerda Höglund (1878–1973), painter specializing in sacred art
Marie Höglund (born 1955), glass artist
Siv Holme (1914–2001), painter, sculptor
Rose-Marie Huuva (born 1943), textile artist, poet
Ulrica Hydman Vallien (1938–2018), stained glass artist and ceramist

I 
Helena Sophia Isberg (1819–1875), woodcut artist

J 
Selma Jacobsson (1841–1899), photographer
Eva Jancke-Björk (1882–1981), ceramist, painter, textile artist
Kristina Jansson (born 1967), contemporary artist
Rosa Lie Johansson (died 2004), Swedish-Mexican painter
Arnrid Johnston (1895–1972), sculptor, illustrator
Ellen Jolin (1854–1939), painter
Lina Jonn (1861–1896), photographer
Märta Jörgensen (1874–1967), folk costume designer

K 
Brita-Kajsa Karlsdotter (1816–1915), textile artist
Elisabeth Charlotta Karsten (1789–1856), painter
Sophie Karsten (1783–1862), painter, ballerina
Elisabeth Keyser (1851–1898), painter
Marie Kinnberg (1806–1858), painter and pioneering photographer
Asa Kitok (1894–1986), Sami birch-root artisan
Hilma af Klint (1862–1944), painter
Caroline von Knorring (1841–1925), photographer
Greta Knutson (1899–1983), modernist artist, writer
Amalia Wilhelmina Königsmarck (1663–1740), painter
Wilhelmina Krafft (1778–1828), painter and miniaturist
Klara Kristalova (born 1967), sculptor
Thora Kulle (1849–1939), textile artist and businesswoman

L 
Gunilla Lagerbielke (1926–2013), textile artist
Ava de Lagercrantz (1862–1938), portrait painter
Wilhelmina Lagerholm (1826–1917), portrait and genre painter, photographer
Annika Larsson (born 1972), video artist
Karin Bergöö Larsson (1859–1928), painter, designer
Lisa Larson (born 1931), ceramicist
Karin Bergöö Larsson (1859–1928), painter and designer
Adelaïde Leuhusen (1828–1923), painter, singer
Klara Lidén (born 1979), contemporary artist
Ingeborg Lindborg (1875–1950), painter 
Eva Lindström (born 1952), illustrator and writer
Louise Lidströmer (born 1948), painter, sculptor
Amalia Lindegren (1814–1891), painter, member of the Royal Swedish Academy of Arts
Pija Lindenbaum (born 1955), illustrator, author, designer
Tuija Lindström (born 1950), Finnish-Swedish photographer
Cecilia Lundqvist (born 1971), animator
Katarina Löfström (born 1970), video artist
Miryam Lumpini (born 1993), tattoo artist and painter

M 
Märta Måås-Fjetterström (1873–1941), textile artist
Charlotta Malm-Reuterholm (1768–1845), Finnish-Swedish painter, writer
Stefania Malmsten (born 1967), art director, graphic designer and film producer
Charlotte Mannheimer (1866–1934), painter
Randi Marainen (born 1953), Sami silversmith and artist
Britta Marakatt-Labba (born 1951), Swedish Sámi textile artist
Ida Matton (1863–1940), sculptor
Ulrika Melin (1767–1834), textile artist
Kaisa Melanton (1920–2012), textile artist
Ruth Milles (1873–1941), sculptor
Aleksandra Mir (born 1967), visual artist
Mandana Moghaddam (born 1962), visual artist
Jeanette Möller (1825–1872), painter
Coco Moodysson (born 1970), cartoonist
Ise Morssing (1878–1969), sculptor
Anna Munthe-Norstedt (1854–1936), painter

N 
Catrine Näsmark (born 1970), painter, set designer
Barbro Nilsson (1899–1983), textile artist
Ida Göthilda Nilsson (1840–1920), sculptor
Vera Nilsson (1888–1979), painter
Anna Nordgren (1847–1916), painter and illustrator
Anna Nordlander (1843–1879), painter
Tekla Nordström (1856–1937), painter, engraver
Jenny Nyström (1854–1946), painter, illustrator

O 
Cilluf Olsson (1847–1916), textile artist
Elisabeth Ohlson Wallin (born 1961), photographer
Agda Österberg (1891–1987), textile artist
Barbro Östlihn (1930–1995), painter

P 
Anna Palm de Rosa (1859–1924), painter
Karin Parrow (1900–1984), painter
Ulrika Pasch (1735–1796), painter
Anna Petrus (1886–1949), sculptor, graphic artist and designer

Q 
Ann-Sophie Qvarnström (born 1958), illustrator, silversmith

R 
Mathilda Ranch (1860–1938), photographer
Siri Rathsman (1895–1974), surrealist artist
Emma Rendel (born 1976), graphic novel artist
Sofie Ribbing (1835–1894), painter
Marianne Richter (1916–2010), textile artist
Anna Riwkin-Brick (1908–1970), photographer
Maria Röhl (1801–1875), portrait painter
Lotten Rönquist (1864–1912), painter
Gerda Roosval-Kallstenius (1864–1939), painter
Joanna Rubin Dranger (born 1970), cartoonist, illustrator
Celina Runeborg (1878–1977), painter
Hannah Ryggen (1894–1970), Swedish-Norwegian textile artist

S 
Anna Sahlström (1876–1956), painter and engraver
Emma Schenson (1827–1913), photographer and painter
Caroline Schlyter (born 1961), sculptor, installation artist
Kristina Schmid (born 1972), photographer
Anna Maria Schmilau (died 1725), tapestry artist
Helene Schmitz (born 1960), photographer
Ida von Schulzenheim (1859–1940), painter
Anna Brita Sergel (1733–1819), textile artist
Ann-Sofi Sidén (born 1962), visual artist
Amanda Sidwall (1844–1892), painter, illustrator 
Josabeth Sjöberg (1812–1882), painter
Ann Mari Sjögren (1918–2010), painter, illustrator
Hilda Sjölin (1835–1915), photographer
Rosalie Sjöman (1833–1919), photographer
Monica Sjöö (1938–2005), painter, writer
Maja Sjöström (1868–1961), textile artist
Gudrun Slettengren-Fernholm (1909–1980), ceramicist and sculptor
Emma Josepha Sparre (1851–1913), painter
Wendela Gustafva Sparre (1772–1855), textile artist
Evelina Stading (1803–1829), landscape painter
Margareta Stafhell (1720–1762), chalcographist
Pernilla Stalfelt (born 1962), children's writer and illustrator
Sylvia Stave (1908–1994), silversmith
Katharina Stenbeck (born 1987), contemporary artist and singer
Birgitta Stenberg (1932–2014), illustrator, author
Ulla Stenberg (1792–1858), textile artist
Magdalena Margareta Stenbock (1744–1822), painter
Gustava Johanna Stenborg (1776–1819), textile artist
Annika Ström (born 1964), visual artist
Minna Sundberg (born 1990), illustrator, cartoonist
Harriet Sundström (1872–1961), painter
Sigrid Synnergren (1894–1986), textile artist

T 
Rosa Taikon (1926–2017), Swedish-Romani silversmith
Astri Taube (1898–1980), sculptor
Maria Tesch (1850–1936), photographer
Anna Maria Thelott (1683–1710), engraver, illustrator, woodcut-artist and miniaturist painter
Hildegard Thorell (1850–1930), painter
Anna-Clara Tidholm (born 1946), children's writer, illustrator
Marit Törnqvist (born 1964), Swedish-Dutch illustrator
Cecilia Torudd (born 1942), cartoonist
Joanna Troikowicz (born 1952), Polish-Swedish sculptor
Ida Trotzig (1864–1943), photographer, ethnographer, Japanologist, painter and writer

U 
Hedvig Ulfsparre, (1877–1963), textile collector
Irène K:son Ullberg (born 1930), painter
Bea Uusma (born 1966), author, illustrator, physician

V 
Bertha Valerius (1824–1895), painter, photographer

W 
Charlotte Wahlström (1849–1924), painter
Gerda Wallander (1860–1926), painter
Berit Wallenberg (1902–1995), archaeologist, art historian, photographer
Bianca Wallin (1909–2006), painter
Elin Wallin (1884–1969), painter
Carin Wästberg (1859–1942), textile artist
Wilhelmina Wendt (1896–1988), silversmith
Maria Widebeck (1858–1929), textile artist
Agnes Wieslander (1873–1934), painter
Ilon Wikland (born 1930), illustrator
Helena Willis (born 1964), illustrator, writer
Hanna Winge (1838–1896), painter
Stina Wirsén (born 1968), illustrator, writer
Gunilla Wolde (1939–2015), writer, illustrator
Stina Wollter (born 1964), painter, illustrator

Z
Lilli Zickerman (1858–1949), textile artist

See also
Hall of Femmes
List of Scandinavian textile artists

-
Swedish
Artists, women
Artists